Ibieca is a village in Aragon, Spain.

Monuments
San Miguel de Foces
Church of Pope Clement I (Ibieca)

References

External links
 www.caiaragon.com/Ibieca

Municipalities in the Province of Huesca